Lobstermen, Lobster Man, or, variation, may refer to:

 Lobsterman, a fisherman who specializes in lobster

Television
 Deadliest Catch: Lobstermen, a 2007 reality TV documentary about lobster fishing
 Lobstermen: Jeopardy at Sea, the pilot miniseries for Deadliest Catch: Lobstermen
 Aussie Lobster Men, a 2019 reality TV documentary series about lobster fishing
 "The Lobster Man" (TV episode), a 1968 episode of the TV series Voyage to the Bottom of the Sea

Other uses
 Quintana Roo Lobstermen, a baseball team that played at Estadio de Béisbol Beto Ávila, Cancun, Mexico
 The Lobster Man, a 1915 waterscape painting by Frank Weston Benson
 Lobster Man, a two Royal Dalton figure3 designed by M. Nicoll
 Lobster Men, a fictional alien species

See also

 Lobster fishing

 Lobster (disambiguation)